John Frederick Morris (14 October 1880 – 23 March 1960) was an English first-class cricketer.

Morris was born at Ampthill. He later studied at the University of Cambridge, where he made a single appearance in first-class cricket for Cambridge University against London County at Fenner's in 1902. He batted twice in the match, ending both Cambridge innings' not out with scores of 7 and 2. In addition to playing first-class cricket, Morris also played minor counties cricket for Bedfordshire from 1900–02, making nine appearances. He died at Norwich in March 1960.

References

External links

1880 births
1960 deaths
People from Ampthill
Alumni of the University of Cambridge
English cricketers
Bedfordshire cricketers
Cambridge University cricketers